North Shore University Hospital (formerly known as Manhasset Hospital) is a part of Northwell Health, New York State's largest healthcare provider and private employer. It is a primary teaching hospital for the Donald & Barbara Zucker School of Medicine at Hofstra/Northwell (along with Long Island Jewish Medical Center), offering residency programs, postgraduate training programs and clinical fellowships. It is located in Manhasset, New York.

A level I trauma center, North Shore University Hospital has 738 beds and a staff of approximately 4,000 specialty and subspecialty physicians. It offers care in all medical and surgical specialties, including cardiovascular services, cancer care, orthopedics, maternal-fetal medicine and women's health services. The hospital offers neuroscience capabilities, including the Harvey Cushing Institutes of Neuroscience. These include the Chiari Institute, Movement Disorders Institute, Brain Tumor Institute, Brain Aneurysm Center, Headache Center, and Spine Center as well as a state-designated stroke center. The campus also contains the Sandra Bass Heart Hospital and Sandra Atlas Bass center for Liver Diseases which both collaborate to perform transplant services including Heart, Liver and Kidney.

The campus is home to the Feinstein Institute for Medical Research.

History

The hospital
The ceremony was held on May 6, 1951 and televised live by NBC. The hospital opened on July 27, 1953, with 169 beds, 253 doctors, 108 nurses, and volunteers.

The addition of the Payson-Whitney Pavilion in 1963 increased the inpatient capacity to 286 beds. Changes from 1969 to 1976 included creation of the Cohen Pavilion and the Levitt Ambulatory Care Clinic. The Payson-Whitney Pavilion also was expanded to ten stories and named the Payson-Whitney Tower (now just Tower Pavilion). This increased the hospital's inpatient capacity to 512 beds.

In 1992, the construction of the Don Monti Memorial Pavilion increased inpatient capacity to 731 beds. In 2006, North Shore University Hospital named its campus in honor for contributor and trustee, Sandra Atlas Bass.

The hospital was designed by Manoug Exerjian.

The health system
In the 1990s, North Shore University Hospital started acquiring and merging with hospitals in the New York area, starting in 1990 with the Community Hospital at Glen Cove, now Glen Cove Hospital - The Mildred and Frank Feinberg Campus. The two hospitals formed the North Shore Regional Health Services Corporation, soon renamed the North Shore Health System.

The North Shore Health System continued to expand to other communities on Long Island over the next several years. By 1995, it developed sponsorship agreements with Franklin Hospital in Valley Stream and Huntington Hospital, and acquired Syosset Hospital, Plainview Hospital, and LaGuardia Hospital (later renamed Forest Hills Hospital) from the HIP of Greater New York as Syosset Community Hospital, Franklin Hospital Medical Center (now Franklin Hospital), Central General Hospital (now Plainview Hospital) and LaGuardia Hospital (now Forest Hills Hospital).

In 1997, the two largest medical centers on Long Island, North Shore Health System and Long Island Jewish Medical Center, merged, creating the North Shore-Long Island Jewish Health System, which is known today as Northwell Health. In 2008 Northwell was the third-largest non-profit secular healthcare system in the United States, based on number of beds.

Research

In 1991, Anthony Cerami left Rockefeller University and founded the Picower Institute for Medical Research on the grounds of North Shore University Hospital; the institute was funded by Jeffry Picower.

The Institute for Medical Research at North Shore-Long Island Jewish was founded in 1999 and in 2002 it acquired the Picower Institute. In 2005 board member Leonard Feinstein, the co-founder of Bed Bath & Beyond, made a multimillion-dollar gift to the institute, which led to its being renamed The Feinstein Institute for Medical Research.

Academics

In 1969, North Shore Hospital affiliated with Cornell University Medical College (now Weill Medical College of Cornell University), changing its name to North Shore University Hospital. The hospital established an affiliation with NYU School of Medicine in 1994 and with the Albert Einstein College of Medicine of Yeshiva University upon merging with Long Island Jewish Medical Center.

After the merger of North Shore Health System and Long Island Jewish Medical Center, the health system moved to gradually merge its academics, culminating in 2012 with the merger of North Shore and Long Island Jewish internal medicine residency programs.

In October 2007, Hofstra University announced that it would open a new medical school, in partnership with Northwell Health. The Donald and Barbara Zucker School of Medicine at Hofstra/Northwell opened in 2011. As of 2019, the Zucker School of Medicine ranks 72 in best medical schools nationwide for research.

In addition to undergraduate medical education, Northwell Health provides graduate medical education to over 1200 residents and fellows through its 90 residency and fellowship training programs.

References

Hospital buildings completed in 1953
Hospital buildings completed in 1992
Teaching hospitals in New York (state)
Hospitals in New York (state)
Hospitals established in 1953
New York University
Northwell Health
Hofstra University
1953 establishments in New York (state)
Trauma centers